Buddy's Bug Hunt is an American animated short film, released June 22, 1935. It is a Looney Tunes cartoon, featuring Buddy, the second star of the series. It was supervised by Jack King; and musical direction was by Norman Spencer.

Summary
Young bug-catcher Buddy merrily chases an insect with a net, eventually leading it into his "Bug House," a backyard shack in which he collects and studies bugs.  Buddy then removes a happy spider from its web and etherizes it upon a table, so that he might examine it with his microscope. As the spider cries, Buddy dispenses more ether. The ether, running off, sends Our Hero spiraling off to unconsciousness. Buddy starts dreaming.

The spider breaks free of the microscope and laughs to see its captor straddled about the floor, helpless. The spider leaps to a table on which a jar containing several other spiders are kept, and frees its fellows. One spider proceeds to free a frog trapped in a bottle; almost no time has passed, and several spiders already have a wakeful Buddy suspended beneath a web. The freed frog directs the contents of a box of "Reducing Pills" into a glass of water, then sucks up the water with a straw, and spits it into the struggling Buddy's mouth, by way of a funnel there placed. Our Hero shrinks almost instantly to the size of one of his captives. The creatures laugh, applaud in derision, point at their captive, and sing of their victory.

A hornet leads Buddy to the place of his trial: a repurposed radio. By way of some flypaper and alphabet soup letters, the insects announce: "Hear Ye! Hear Ye! Buddy will be tried in court for cruelty to insects!" All are commanded to be silent for the approach of the judge, a bee that emerges from a cuckoo clock, who swears all to the truth. The first witness was a grasshopper who approaches Buddy, he claims that he yanked off his leg. The next is a female butterfly, an orphan child, who reportedly had her parents taken from her by Buddy and was left to die. Another female insect was widowed by the defenseless plaintiff. Through all this, the judge continues to smack Buddy's head with his gavel.

Following the testimony of the witnesses, the jury finds Buddy guilty as charged. As punishment for his crimes, they set the flame of a cigar lighter to Buddy's behind. Our Hero screams for help and awakens from his dream to find a magnifying glass reflecting sunlight onto his backside, setting his trousers aflame. Buddy dashes over to a tub of water, in which he sits to relieve the problem. Then, onto business, he goes. He opens all the cages, sets all of his prisoners free, and shuts the door of Buddy's Bug House. The shutdown is indeed forever, for the entire structure crumbles around him as he does so. Two frogs play before him, on a plank of wood, as though it were a see-saw.

ACME Trademark
This is the first Warner Bros. cartoon to display the iconic Acme Corporation trademark. The trademark appears on a box early in the dream sequence, and is also the brand of the flypaper used by the insects for their declaration.

That's All Folks!
The traditional Looney Tunes benediction, "That's all, folks!", given by Bosko, Buddy, and Porky Pig, is here, and for the first time (despite the original ending card of the short being lost through time), delivered by Beans the Cat. At the time of the release of Buddy's Bug Hunt, Beans had already made his first appearance (alongside Porky) in the Merrie Melody I Haven't Got a Hat, and, presumably, was already anticipated as (or considered) the new star of Warner Bros.'s cartoons. Beans appeared in nine shorts before he was entirely displaced by Porky Pig, to whom the duty of the ending salute would most famously pass.

References

External links
 
 

1935 films
1935 animated films
1930s American animated films
1930s animated short films
American black-and-white films
American courtroom films
Animated films about insects
Films scored by Norman Spencer (composer)
Films about dreams
Films about spiders
Films directed by Jack King
Buddy (Looney Tunes) films
Looney Tunes shorts
Films about size change